Pirjad-e Pain (also Romanized as Pīrjad-e Pā’īn; also known as Pīrjed, Pīrjerd, and Pīr Jad) is a village in Koregah-e Sharqi Rural District, in the Central District of Khorramabad County, Lorestan Province, Iran. At the 2006 census, its population was 107, in 24 families.

References 

Towns and villages in Khorramabad County